In six-dimensional geometry, a stericated 6-orthoplex is a convex uniform 6-polytope, constructed as a sterication (4th order truncation) of the regular 6-orthoplex.

There are 16 unique sterications for the 6-orthoplex with permutations of truncations, cantellations, and runcinations. Eight are better represented from the stericated 6-cube.

Stericated 6-orthoplex

Alternate names 
 Small cellated hexacontatetrapeton (Acronym: scag) (Jonathan Bowers)

Images

Steritruncated 6-orthoplex

Alternate names 
 Cellitruncated hexacontatetrapeton (Acronym: catog) (Jonathan Bowers)

Images

Stericantellated 6-orthoplex

Alternate names 
 Cellirhombated hexacontatetrapeton (Acronym: crag) (Jonathan Bowers)

Images

Stericantitruncated 6-orthoplex

Alternate names 
 Celligreatorhombated hexacontatetrapeton (Acronym: cagorg) (Jonathan Bowers)

Images

Steriruncinated 6-orthoplex

Alternate names 
 Celliprismated hexacontatetrapeton (Acronym: copog) (Jonathan Bowers)

Images

Steriruncitruncated 6-orthoplex

Alternate names 
 Celliprismatotruncated hexacontatetrapeton (Acronym: captog) (Jonathan Bowers)

Images

Steriruncicantellated 6-orthoplex

Alternate names 
 Celliprismatorhombated hexacontatetrapeton (Acronym: coprag) (Jonathan Bowers)

Images

Steriruncicantitruncated 6-orthoplex

Alternate names 
 Great cellated hexacontatetrapeton (Acronym: gocog) (Jonathan Bowers)

Images

Snub 6-demicube 

Related polytopes

These polytopes are from a set of 63 uniform 6-polytopes generated from the B6 Coxeter plane, including the regular 6-orthoplex or 6-orthoplex.

Notes

References
 H.S.M. Coxeter: 
 H.S.M. Coxeter, Regular Polytopes, 3rd Edition, Dover New York, 1973 
 Kaleidoscopes: Selected Writings of H.S.M. Coxeter, edited by F. Arthur Sherk, Peter McMullen, Anthony C. Thompson, Asia Ivic Weiss, Wiley-Interscience Publication, 1995,  
 (Paper 22) H.S.M. Coxeter, Regular and Semi Regular Polytopes I, [Math. Zeit. 46 (1940) 380-407, MR 2,10]
 (Paper 23) H.S.M. Coxeter, Regular and Semi-Regular Polytopes II, [Math. Zeit. 188 (1985) 559-591]
 (Paper 24) H.S.M. Coxeter, Regular and Semi-Regular Polytopes III, [Math. Zeit. 200 (1988) 3-45]
 Norman Johnson Uniform Polytopes, Manuscript (1991)
 N.W. Johnson: The Theory of Uniform Polytopes and Honeycombs, Ph.D.

External links 
 Polytopes of Various Dimensions
 Multi-dimensional Glossary

6-polytopes